My Sister and I (German: Meine Schwester und ich) is a 1929 German silent comedy film directed by Manfred Noa and starring Mady Christians, Hans Junkermann and Jack Trevor. It was shot at the National Studios in Berlin. The film's art direction was by Ferdinand Bellan and Alexander Ferenczy.

Cast
 Mady Christians as Prinzessin Matgarete von Marquardstein  
 Hans Junkermann as Fürst von Marquardstein  
 Jack Trevor as Baron Udo von Ebenhausen  
 Igo Sym as Dr. Gustav Müller  
 Tilla Garden as Irmgard von Pleß  
 Charles Puffy as Sebastian Puffinger  
 Camilla Spira as Schuh-Molly  
 Jakob Tiedtke as Kunde

References

Bibliography
 Heike Klapdor. Ich bin ein unheilbarer Europäer: Briefe aus dem Exil. Aufbau, 2007.

External links

1929 films
1929 comedy films
German comedy films
Films of the Weimar Republic
German silent feature films
Films directed by Manfred Noa
Films based on works by Louis Verneuil
Films based on operettas
National Film films
German black-and-white films
Silent comedy films
1920s German films
1920s German-language films